Karel Hrbáček (born 1944) is professor emeritus of mathematics at City College of New York.  He specializes in mathematical logic, set theory, and non-standard analysis.

Karel studied at Charles University with Petr Vopěnka, looking at large cardinal numbers. He was awarded the degree RNDr. Before his appointment at CCNY he was an exchange fellow at University of California, Berkeley and a research associate at Rockefeller University. In 1980 he received an award from the Mathematical Association of America for his article on Non-standard Set Theory.

Selected publications
 1999: (with Thomas Jech) Introduction to Set Theory, Third edition. Monographs and Textbooks in Pure and Applied Mathematics, 220. Marcel Dekker 
 1992: (with David Ballard) "Standard foundations for nonstandard analysis", Journal of Symbolic Logic  57(2): 741–748 
 1979: "Nonstandard set theory", American Mathematical Monthly  86(8): 659–677 
 1978: "Axiomatic foundations for nonstandard analysis", Fundamenta Mathematicae  98(1): 1–19

References

Mathematical logicians
Set theorists
City College of New York faculty
1944 births
Living people